Kinzer or Kinzers may refer to:

People
Daria Kinzer (b. 1988), a Croatian singer
Edward B. Kinzer (1917-1942), a United States Navy officer and Navy Cross recipient
John J. Kinzer (1891-1986), American farmer and politician
J. Roland Kinzer (1874-1955), an American politician
Matt Kinzer (b. 1963), an American professional baseball and football player
Stephen Kinzer (b. 1951), an American author and newspaper reporter

Places

United States
Kinzer, Missouri
Kinzers, Pennsylvania
John Kinzer House in Indiana

Ships
USS Kinzer (APD-91), originally laid down as destroyer escort USS Kinzer (DE-232), a United States Navy fast transport in commission from 1944 to 1946